Pace Shewan Mannion (born September 22, 1960) is an American retired professional basketball player who played in the National Basketball Association (NBA) and in the Italian league with the team of Cantù (which won the FIBA Korać Cup in 1991 defeating Real Madrid in the final when he scored 35 points). He has worked as a studio analyst for the Utah Jazz television pre- and post-game shows.

A  small forward born in Salt Lake City, Utah and from the University of Utah, he was selected 43rd overall by the Golden State Warriors in the 1983 NBA Draft. Over six NBA seasons with as many teams, he averaged 3.1 points, 1.2 rebounds and 1.1 assists per game.

Career statistics

NBA

Regular season

|-
| align="left" | 1983–84
| align="left" | Golden State
| 57 || 0 || 8.2 || .397 || .231 || .783 || 1.0 || 0.8 || 0.4 || 0.0 || 2.1
|-
| align="left" | 1984–85
| align="left" | Utah
| 34 || 0 || 5.6 || .429 || .000 || .696 || 0.7 || 0.8 || 0.5 || 0.1 || 2.1
|-
| align="left" | 1985–86
| align="left" | Utah
| 57 || 0 || 11.8 || .453 || .190 || .646 || 1.4 || 1.0 || 0.6 || 0.1 || 4.5
|-
| align="left" | 1986–87
| align="left" | New Jersey
| 23 || 3 || 12.3 || .330 || .333 || .581 || 1.7 || 2.0 || 0.8 || 0.2 || 3.6
|-
| align="left" | 1987–88
| align="left" | Milwaukee
| 35 || 1 || 13.6 || .407 || .167 || .676 || 1.5 || 1.6 || 0.4 || 0.2 || 3.5
|-
| align="left" | 1988–89
| align="left" | Detroit
| 5 || 0 || 2.8 || 1.000 || .000 || .000 || 0.6 || 0.0 || 0.2 || 0.0 || 0.8
|-
| align="left" | 1988–89
| align="left" | Atlanta
| 5 || 0 || 3.6 || .333 || .000 || .000 || 0.4 || 0.4 || 0.4 || 0.0 || 0.8
|- class="sortbottom"
| style="text-align:center;" colspan="2"| Career
| 216 || 4 || 9.8 || .413 || .203 || .663 || 1.2 || 1.1 || 0.5 || 0.1 || 3.1
|}

Playoffs

|-
| align="left" | 1984–85
| align="left" | Utah
| 8 || 0 || 5.1 || .333 || .000 || .833 || 0.9 || 0.5 || 0.1 || 0.3 || 2.3
|- class="sortbottom"
| style="text-align:center;" colspan="2"| Career
| 8 || 0 || 5.1 || .333 || .000 || .833 || 0.9 || 0.5 || 0.1 || 0.3 || 2.3
|}

College

|-
| align="left" | 1979–80
| align="left" | Utah
| 28 || - || 16.3 || .378 || - || .867 || 1.9 || - || 0.8 || 0.1 || 3.1
|-
| align="left" | 1980–81
| align="left" | Utah
| 28 || - || 32.2 || .448 || - || .595 || 3.3 || - || 1.0 || 0.2 || 6.9
|-
| align="left" | 1981–82
| align="left" | Utah
| 28 || - || 37.9 || .433 || - || .660 || 4.4 || - || 1.7 || 0.5 || 10.4
|-
| align="left" | 1982–83
| align="left" | Utah
| 32 || - || 37.3 || .483 || - || .812 || 4.6 || - || 2.0 || 0.4 || 13.9
|- class="sortbottom"
| style="text-align:center;" colspan="2"| Career
| 116 || - || 31.2 || .451 || - || .724 || 3.6 || - || 1.4 || 0.3 || 8.8
|}

Pace Mannion Fan Club

In 1983, a group of Rice University students at Wiess College started the Pace Mannion Fan Club after watching him trip over his own feet while taking a breakaway layup during the NCAA playoffs. The fan club would attend Mannion's NBA games in Houston and occasionally San Antonio, and would scream for Mannion to play, normally only to see him get a few minutes of floor time.

On January 14, 1986, Mannion and the Utah Jazz came to play the Houston Rockets, who had a 20-game home unbeaten streak. About 125 members of the Pace Mannion Fan Club attended the game.

The fan club cheered "Pace, Pace, he's our Mannion" all night. Utah coach Frank Layden sent Mannion into the game early in the fourth quarter. By the time the game ended, Mannion had 13 points. The Jazz won the game 105–102.

Personal life
He is the father of basketball player Nico Mannion.

References

External links
College & NBA stats @ basketball-reference.com
CBA stats @ justsportsstats.com
Lega Basket stats @ legabasket.it

1960 births
Living people
American expatriate basketball people in Italy
American men's basketball players
Atlanta Hawks players
Basketball players from Salt Lake City
Detroit Pistons players
Golden State Warriors draft picks
Golden State Warriors players
Milwaukee Bucks players
New Jersey Nets players
Pallacanestro Cantù players
Pallacanestro Treviso players
Pallacanestro Reggiana players
Rockford Lightning players
Small forwards
Utah Jazz players
Utah Utes men's basketball players